The Lost Rhino Brewing Company, located in Ashburn, Virginia, produces beer and root beer at the same time.

History
Lost Rhino Brewing Company was founded by Matt Hagerman and Favio Garcia, two former brewers from Old Dominion Brewing Company in Loudoun County. The company name comes from a surfing term, "rhino chaser," which is defined as "someone out to find the best waves, the biggest waves—an adventurer."  

In May 2011, Lost Rhino opened, with their products using locally sourced ingredients from Virginia farms. 

In 2013, using malt and hops grown in state, local water and yeast cultured at the brewery, Garcia and Jasper Akerboom brewed "Native Son," the first "all Virginia beer" in modern history.

Great American Beer Festival
2013: Gold - Rhinofest (German Style Marzen Category)

2016 Silver - Face Plant IPA (English-Style India Pale Ale)

References

2011 establishments in Virginia
Beer brewing companies based in Virginia
American companies established in 2011 
Food and drink companies established in 2011 
Loudoun County, Virginia